PPM may refer to:

Business in general
 Planned preventive maintenance
 Project portfolio management
 Public performance measure, UK measure of rail punctuality
 Procurement Performance Management

Organizations
 Mauritanian People's Party
 Parry People Movers, UK flywheel vehicle manufacturer
 Pashtun Tahafuz Movement (PTM), also known as the Pashtun Protection Movement (PPM), a human rights movement in Pakistan for the Pashtun people
 Partido Popular Monárquico (People's Monarchist Party), Portugal
 Persekutuan Pengakap Malaysia, the Scouts Association of Malaysia
 People's Progressive Movement (Cayman Islands)
 Progressive Party of Maldives

Science and technology

Computing
 Pages per minute, a measurement of printing speed
 Perl package manager, for software packages
Planted partition model, a special case of Stochastic block model
 Portable pixmap format, a Netpbm format
 Prediction by partial matching, a data compression technique

Medicine
 Permanent pacemaker
 Persistent pupillary membrane, an eye condition
 Physician practice management

Online advertising 
 PPM (Pay per 1000 impressions)

Other uses in science and technology
 Parts per million, ppm
 Carbon dioxide in Earth's atmosphere,  ppm
 Peak programme meter, measuring audio level
 PPM Star Catalogue of 378,910 stars
 Proton precession magnetometer, measures small magnetic field variations
 Pulse-position modulation of a signal.
 Planned Preventative Maintenance for Telecom Systems.

Other uses
 Pepsi Venezuela Music Awards (Premios Pepsi Music Venezuela)
 Portable People Meter, to measure radio and TV broadcast audiences
 Private Placement Memorandum, offering document for private placements
 Peter, Paul and Mary, American folk group

See also
 Temperature coefficient, in parts per million per Kelvin (ppm/K) or per degree Celsius (ppm/C)